The 2016 Offaly Senior Football Championship was the 119th edition of Offaly GAA's premier Gaelic football competition for senior graded clubs in County Offaly, Ireland. Eight teams compete, with the winner representing Offaly in the Leinster Senior Club Football Championship.

The championship starts with two groups of four teams and progresses to a knockout stage.

Edenderry were the defending champions after they defeated Rhode in the previous years final, however they failed to qualify for the knock-out stages this season.

This was Ballycumber's return to the senior grade after claiming the 2015 Offaly Senior B Football Championship title. They made the straight bounce back to the top flight after being relegated in 2014 to the Senior B championship due to the changing format of the championships, where the number of teams in the senior grade was reduced from 12 to 8. However, Ballycumber were relegated back to the Senior B Championship at the end of the season.

On 16 October 2016, Rhode claimed their 27th S.F.C. title when defeating Ferbane 1-14 to 0-9 in the final at O'Connor Park.

Team changes 

The following teams have changed division since the 2015 championship season.

To S.F.C. 
Promoted from 2015 Offaly Senior B Football Championship
 Ballycumber – (Intermediate Champions)

From S.F.C. 
Relegated to 2016 Offaly Senior B Football Championship
 St Brigid's

Group stage 
There are 2 groups called Group A and B. The top two finishers in each group qualified for the semi-finals. The bottom finishers of each group qualified for the Relegation Final.

Group A 

Round 1
 Rhode 0-20, 1-11 Tullamore, 23/7/2016,
 Edenderry 1-12, 0-13 Clara, 23/7/2016,

Round 2
 Rhode 2-18, 2-7 Edenderry, 6/8/2016,
 Tullamore 1-11, 0-11 Clara, 6/8/2016,

Round 3
 Edenderry 0-15, 2-9 Tullamore, 26/8/2016,
 Rhode 6-16, 0-17 Clara, 27/8/2016,

Group B 

Round 1
 Gracefield 2-12, 1-9 St Rynagh's, 24/7/2016,
 Ferbane 1-16, 0-8 Ballycumber, 24/7/2016,

Round 2
 Ferbane 3-10, 1-4 Gracefield, 7/8/2016,
 St Rynagh's 2-7, 0-7 Ballycumber, 7/8/2016,

Round 3
 Gracefield 2-17, 2-11 Ballycumber, 28/8/2016,
 Ferbane 3-10, 1-10 St Rynagh's, 28/8/2016,

Knock-out Stage

Last Four 
The winners and runners up of each group qualified for the quarter finals.

Semi-finals

Final

Relegation Play Off 
The bottom team from each group play off in the relegation final with the loser relegated to the 2017 Senior B Championship.

 Clara 3-13, 0-5 Ballycumber, Tubber, 9/9/2016

Leinster Senior Club Football Championship

References 

Offaly Senior Football Championship
Offaly Senior Football Championship